Sirembe Secondary School was established in 1989. It is a mixed day and partly boarding secondary school. Sirembe Secondary School is located along Kodiaga-Siaya Road in Sirembe Sub Location, Gem Constituency in  Siaya County in Kenya.

School Postal address is  P.O BOX 143-40612, SAWAGONGO, KENYA

The school's population currently stands at approximately 500 students. The school has produced notable Alumni, Ronald McAgak (Journalist), Maxwell Odera ( High school Teacher), Judith Nyajom ( CDC/KEMRI), Mophat Onyango (Engineer) Benard Okoth( Film Maker), Victor Omondi (Social Scientist), Samson Opondo ( Pharmacist) Duncan Mola, Belvin Okaka,  among others.

Performance

The School became position 29 Nationwide among the district secondary schools  in the 2013 KSCE  

Partnership

The school currently partners with Restore Humanity, a non-profit making organisation that aims at making the dreams of financially incapacitated students a reality. The organisation sponsors a number of students in the school  Currently Restore Humanity is running  a campaign " OUTREACH #EDUCATE40 " that aims at sending 30 Kenyan Girls and 10 boys to High School 

The school also works closely with other community based organisations, the CDF, government and other organisations

Leadership

The school is Currently headed by Henry Oyuga Airo. Former Principals include the late Peter Odida Owuor, Ernest Odero and Walter Onyango

Digital Media platforms

Website/blog : Sirembe Secondary School

References

External links 
 Sirembe School Website Retrieved on 17 January 2017
 Shule Zote Retrieved on 17 January 2017
 Elimu Centre Retrieved on 17 January 2017
 The Standard Newspaper Retrieved on 17 January 2017
 Advance Africa Retrieved on 17 January 2017
 Restore Humanity Retrieved on 17 January 2017

Educational institutions established in 1989
High schools and secondary schools in Kenya
Education in Nyanza Province
Siaya County
1989 establishments in Kenya